Kerem Shalom border crossing is a border crossing at the junction of the Gaza Strip–Israel border and the Gaza–Egypt border. It is managed by the Israel Airports Authority, and is used by trucks carrying goods from Israel or Egypt to the Gaza Strip.

Operation
Until 2007, European monitors from the European Union Border Assistance Mission Rafah (EUBAM Rafah) used the Kerem Shalom crossing to get to the Rafah Border Crossing. The EUBAM heads a Liaison Office at Kerem Shalom which receives real-time video and data feeds of the activities at the Rafah crossing. The Liaison Office meets regularly to review implementation of the Agreed Principles for Rafah Crossing, to resolve any dispute pertaining to the agreement, and to perform other tasks specified therein. The Liaison Office is manned by liaison officers from EUBAM, the Palestinian Authority, and the Government of Israel.

Since 2010, NIS 75 million have been invested in upgrading and expanding the crossing, which is capable of handling 450 trucks a day.

The Palestinian side of the crossing is operated by two families who were granted a franchise by the Palestinian Authority and authorized by Hamas. The Ministry of Commerce and Industry in Ramallah coordinates activity with Israel. The two sides are 400 meters apart, separated by a drop-off zone for unloading goods.

In December 2012, Israel eased its restrictions on the import of building materials, allowing the transfer of 20 truckloads of aggregates and 34 truckloads of gravel from Egypt. The volume is expected to increase to 100 trucks a day.

Incidents
On 25 June 2006, Corporal Gilad Shalit was captured by Palestinian Hamas militants near Kerem Shalom after the attackers infiltrated the border from the Gaza Strip into Israel via a tunnel. Two Israeli Defense Force soldiers were killed and three others wounded, in addition to Shalit. In response and with the mission of rescuing Shalit, IDF entered Gaza Strip as part of Operation Summer Rains on 28 June. Shalit was freed in a prisoner exchange on 18 October 2011.

On 19 April 2008, Palestinian suicide bombers detonated their explosives-laden vehicles at the crossing. According to the IDF, two jeeps and an armored personnel carrier were used and two vehicles were detonated killing three bombers and wounding 13 Israeli soldiers. The soldiers were protected from serious injury by fortifications at the crossing. A second armored personnel carrier close to the border north of Kerem Shalom was blown up by Israeli fire soon after the bombing. Hamas claimed responsibility for the attack. According to Abu Obeidah, spokesman for Izz ad-Din al-Qassam Brigades, the Hamas affiliated military wing, four booby-trapped vehicles were used, three of which exploded and one withdrew. He described it as "a gift for the people under siege" and "a purely military operation".   
 
On 5 August 2012, the crossing was attacked by a group of masked gunmen who had killed 16 police officers and hijacked armored jeeps from an Egyptian border checkpoint. One jeep, apparently booby-trapped, rammed the checkpoint and exploded; the other was destroyed by the Israeli Air Force.

On 14 January 2018,  Israeli Air Force planes demolished "a terror tunnel that passed under the Kerem Shalom Crossing from Gaza into Israel. The Israeli Defense Force said with certainty that the tunnel belonged to Hamas.The tunnel started in the Rafiah area 900 meters (2,953 feet) into Gaza and extended 180 meters (591 feet) into Israel. It passed under the gas pipeline between Egypt and Gaza."

See also
Kerem Shalom

References

External links 
Exit of goods from Gaza via Kerem Shalom Crossing. Statistics from Gisha

Eshkol Regional Council
Geography of the Gaza Strip
Gaza–Israel conflict
Israel–Gaza Strip border
Israel–Gaza Strip border crossings
Egypt–Israel border crossings
Geography of Southern District (Israel)